Tetracis is a genus of moths in the family Geometridae erected by Achille Guenée in 1858.

Species
Tetracis australis Ferris, 2009
Tetracis barnesii (Hulst, 1896)
Tetracis cachexiata Guenée, [1858] – white slant-line
Tetracis cervinaria (Packard, 1871)
Tetracis crocallata Guenée, [1858]
Tetracis formosa (Hulst, 1896)
Tetracis fuscata (Hulst, 1898)
Tetracis hirsutaria (Barnes & McDunnough, 1913)
Tetracis jubararia Hulst, 1886
Tetracis montanaria Ferris, 2009
Tetracis mosesiani (Sala, [1971])
Tetracis pallidata Ferris, 2009
Tetracis pallulata (Hulst, 1887)

References

Revision of the North American genera Tetracis Guenée and synonymization of Synaxis Hulst with descriptions of three new species (Lepidoptera: Geometridae: Ennominae)

 
Taxa named by George Duryea Hulst
Geometridae genera